The Journal of Business Research is a monthly peer-reviewed academic journal covering research on all aspects of business. It was established in 1973 and is published by Elsevier. The editors-in-chief are Naveen Donthu (Georgia State University) and Anders Gustafsson (BI Norwegian Business School).

Abstracting and indexing
The journal is abstracted and indexed in Current Contents/Social & Behavioral Sciences, PsycINFO/Psychological Abstracts, RePEc, Scopus, and the Social Sciences Citation Index. According to the Journal Citation Reports, the journal has a 2020 impact factor of 7.550

References

External links
 

English-language journals
Business and management journals
Publications established in 1973
Monthly journals
Elsevier academic journals